Wyoming Highway 151 (WYO 151) is a  Wyoming State Road, known as LaGrange Road, that is located in extreme southeastern Goshen County.

Route description
WYO 151 runs east–west from US 85 west of LaGrange to the Nebraska-Wyoming State Line. Once it crosses into Nebraska it becomes Nebraska Highway 88, which links to the Heartland Expressway Corridor (Nebraska Highway 71) just south of the Scottsbluff - Gering area. Mileposts along WYO 151 increase from west to east. Wyoming Highway 151 passes through La Grange between Mileposts 3.84 and 4.34.

Major intersections

References

External links 

Wyoming State Routes 100-199
WYO 151 - US-85 to NE 88/Nebraska State Line

Transportation in Goshen County, Wyoming
151